Lynn Adams (born August 18, 1950) is an American professional golfer who played on the LPGA Tour.

Adams won once on the LPGA Tour in 1983.

Professional wins

LPGA Tour wins (1)

LPGA Tour playoff record (0–1)

References

External links

American female golfers
LPGA Tour golfers
Golfers from Texas
Texas A&M University–Kingsville alumni
People from Kingsville, Texas
1950 births
Living people
21st-century American women